The American Institute of Architects (AIA) is a professional organization for architects in the United States. Headquartered in Washington, D.C., the AIA provides education, government advocacy, community redevelopment, and public outreach to support the architecture profession and improve its public image. The AIA also works with other members of the design and construction community to help coordinate the building industry.

The AIA is currently headed by Lakisha Ann Woods, CAE, as EVP/Chief Executive Officer and Emily Grandstaff-Rice, FAIA, as 2023 AIA President.

History

The American Institute of Architects was founded in New York City in 1857 by a group of 13 architects to "promote the scientific and practical perfection of its members" and "elevate the standing of the profession." This initial group included Cornell University Architecture Professor Charles Babcock, Henry W. Cleaveland, Henry Dudley, Leopold Eidlitz, Edward Gardiner, Richard Morris Hunt, Detlef Lienau, Fred A. Petersen, Jacob Wrey Mould, John Welch, Richard M. Upjohn and Joseph C. Wells, with Richard Upjohn serving as the first president. They met on February 23, 1857, and invited 16 other prominent architects to join them, including Alexander Jackson Davis, Thomas U. Walter, Frederick Clarke Withers, and Calvert Vaux. At the time of their establishment of the AIA, anyone could claim to be an architect, as there were no schools of architecture or architectural licensing laws in the United States.

They drafted a constitution and bylaws by March 10, 1857, under the name New York Society of Architects. Thomas U. Walter, of Philadelphia, later suggested the name be changed to American Institute of Architects. The members signed the new constitution on April 15, 1857, having filed a certificate of incorporation two days earlier. The constitution was amended the following year with the mission "to promote the artistic, scientific, and practical profession of its members; to facilitate their intercourse and good fellowship; to elevate the standing of the profession; and to combine the efforts of those engaged in the practice of Architecture, for the general advancement of the Art." Architects in other cities were asking to join in the 1860s. By the 1880s, chapters had been formed in Albany, Baltimore, Boston, Chicago, Cincinnati, Indianapolis, Philadelphia, Rhode Island, San Francisco, St. Louis, and Washington, D.C. As of 2008, AIA had more than 300 chapters.

The AIA is headquartered at 1735 New York Avenue, NW in Washington, D.C. A design competition was held in the mid-1960s to select an architect for a new AIA headquarters in Washington. Mitchell/Giurgola won the design competition but failed to get approval of the design concept from the United States Commission of Fine Arts. The firm resigned the commission and helped select The Architects Collaborative (TAC) to redesign the building. The design, led by TAC principals Norman Fletcher and Howard Elkus, was ultimately approved in 1970 and completed in 1973. In honor of the 150th anniversary of the organization, the building was formally renamed in 2007 the "American Center for Architecture" and is also home to the American Institute of Architecture Students, the Association of Collegiate Schools of Architecture and the National Architectural Accrediting Board.

Organization

Membership
More than 95,000 licensed architects and associated professionals are members. AIA members adhere to a code of ethics and professional conduct intended to assure clients, the public, and colleagues of an architect's dedication to the highest standards in professional practice.

There are five levels of membership in the AIA:
Architect members (AIA) are licensed to practice architecture by a licensing authority in the United States. 
Associate members (Assoc. AIA) are not licensed to practice architecture but they are working under the supervision of an architect in a professional or technical capacity, have earned professional degrees in architecture, are faculty members in a university program in architecture, or are interns earning credit toward licensure.
International associate members hold an architecture license or the equivalent from a licensing authority outside the United States.
Emeritus members have been AIA members for 15 successive years and are at least 70 years of age or are incapacitated and unable to work in the architecture profession.  
Allied members are individuals whose professions are related to the building and design community, such as engineers, landscape architects, or planners; or senior executive staff from building and design-related companies, including publishers, product manufacturers, and research firms. Allied membership is a partnership with the AIA and the American Architectural Foundation.

There is no National AIA membership category for students, but they can become members of the American Institute of Architecture Students and many local and state chapters of the AIA have student membership categories.

The AIA's most prestigious honor is the designation (FAIA) of a member as a Fellow of the American Institute of Architects. This membership is awarded to members who have made contributions of national significance to the profession. Slightly more than 2,600, or 2% of all members, have been elevated to the AIA College of Fellows. Foreign architects of prominence may be elected to the college as Honorary Fellows of the AIA.

Structure
The AIA is governed by a board of directors and has a staff of more than 200 employees. Although the AIA functions as a national organization, its 217 local and state chapters provide members with programming and direct services to support them throughout their professional lives. The chapters cover the entirety of the United States and its territories. Components also operate in the United Kingdom, Continental Europe, the Middle East, Japan, Hong Kong, Shanghai and Canada.

Service
The AIA monitors legislative and regulatory actions and uses the collective power of its membership to participate in decision-making by federal, state, and local policy makers. The AIA's community-based programs work with federal legislators and local governments to elevate the design of public spaces, protect the nation's infrastructure, and develop well-designed affordable housing for all Americans.

The American Institute of Architects announced in June 2013 at CGI America (an annual event of the Clinton Global Initiative) the creation of "Designing Recovery," a design contest in partnership with the charities Make It Right, SBP, and Architecture for Humanity. Sponsored by Dow Building Solutions, a total of $30,000 in prize money was divided equally among three winning designs in New Orleans, Louisiana, Joplin, Missouri, and New York City. Entrants submitted single-family housing designs with the objective of "improving the quality, diversity and resiliency of the housing in each community." Organizers made the portfolio of designs (including from non-winners) available to communities recovering from natural disasters.

Professionalism
The AIA serves its members with professional development opportunities, contract documents that are the model for the design and construction industry, professional and design information services, personal benefits, and client-oriented resources.

In contributing to their profession and communities, AIA members also participate in professional interest areas from design to regional and urban development and professional academies that are both the source and focus of new ideas and responses. To aid younger professionals, an Intern Development Program, Architect Registration Exam preparation courses, and employment referral services are frequently offered by local components.

The AIA holds an annual conference in late spring / early summer that draws the largest gathering of architects in the world.

Public education
The AIA attempts to meet the needs and interests of the nation's architects and the public by raising public awareness of the value of architecture and the importance of good design. To mark the AIA's 150th anniversary and to showcase how AIA members have helped shape the built environment, the AIA and Harris Interactive released findings from a public poll that asked Americans to name their favorite 150 works of architecture.

Two of the AIA's public outreach efforts, the Blueprint for America nationwide community service initiative marking its 150th anniversary and the Sustainability 2030 Toolkit, a resource created to encourage mayors and community leaders to advocate environmentally friendly building design both earned an Award of Excellence in the 2007 Associations Advance America Awards, a national competition sponsored by the American Society of Association Executives and the Center for Association Leadership.

Honors and awards
The AIA has long recognized individuals and organizations for their outstanding achievements in support of the architecture profession and the AIA.

Honors Program 
 AIA Gold Medal
 Architecture Firm Award
 AIA/ACSA Topaz Medallion for Excellence in Architectural Education

Institute Honors 
For new and restoration projects anywhere in the world:
 Institute Honor Awards for Architecture
 Institute Honor Awards for Interior Architecture
 Institute Honor Awards for Regional and Urban Design
 Twenty-five Year Award

This award, recognizing architectural design of enduring significance, is conferred on a project that has stood the test of time for 25 to 35 years. The project must have been designed by an architect licensed in the United States at the time of the project's completion.For Professional Achievement:
 Associates Award
 Collaborative Achievement Award
 Edward C. Kemper Award
 Thomas Jefferson Awards for Public Architecture
 Whitney M. Young Jr. Award
 Young Architects Award
College of Fellows honor – Benjamin Latrobe Prize for Architectural Research
AIA Committee on the Environment AIA/COTE Top Ten Green Projects

Cosponsored programs 
 AIA/ALA Library Building Awards
 AIA Housing Awards
 AIA/HUD Secretary's Housing and Community Design Awards

Membership Honors 
 Honorary Membership (Hon. AIA)
 Fellow of the American Institute of Architects (FAIA)
 Honorary Fellowship (Hon. FAIA)

Magazine

Architect: The Journal of the American Institute of Architects is the official magazine of the AIA, published independently by Washington, D.C.-based business-to-business media company Hanley Wood, LLC. Architect hands out the annual Progressive Architecture Award, in addition to the R+D Awards (for research and development). Architect formerly conducted an Annual Design Review, which it described as "a unique barometer of the business of architecture."

Previously, the official publication of the American Institute of Architects was Architecture, which was preceded in turn by the Journal of the American Institute of Architects. Both of these publications are defunct.

The successor, Architect Magazine, is not owned by but is affiliated with AIA, and uses their name on their masthead.

Presidents
The following people served as presidents, all of whom were elevated to Fellows of the American Institute of Architects:

Richard Upjohn 1857–1876
Thomas Ustick Walter 1877–1887
Richard Morris Hunt 1888–1891
Edward Hale Kendall 1892–1893
Daniel H. Burnham 1894–1895
George Browne Post 1896–1898 6th	
Henry Van Brunt 1899–1900
Robert Swain Peabody 1900–1901
Charles Follen McKim 1902–1903
William S. Eames 1904–1905
Frank Miles Day 1906–1907	
Cass Gilbert 1908–1909	
Irving Kane Pond 1910–1911
Walter Cook 1912–1913
Richard Clipston Sturgis 1913–1915
John Lawrence Mauran 1915–1918
Thomas Rogers Kimball 1918–1920
Henry H. Kendall 1920–1922
William B. Faville 1922–1924	
Dan Everett Waid 1924–1926	
Milton Bennett Medary 1926–1928
Charles Herrick Hammond 1928–1930
Robert D. Kohn 1930–1932
Ernest John Russell 1932–1935
Stephen F. Voorhees 1935–1937	
Charles Donagh Maginnis 1937–1939		
George Edwin Bergstrom 1939–1941
Richmond Harold Shreve 1941–1943	
Raymond J. Ashton 1943–1945
James Richard Edmunds Jr. 1945–1947		
Douglas William Orr 1947–1949	
Ralph Thomas Walker 1949–1951
Glenn Stanton 1951–1953

Clair W. Ditchy 1953–1955		
George Bain Cummings 1955–1956	
Leon Chatelain Jr. 1956–1958
John N. Richards 1958–1960
Philip Will Jr. 1960–1962	
Henry L. Wright 1962–1963
J. Roy Carroll Jr. 1963–1964
Arthur G. Odell Jr. 1964–1965
Morris Ketchum Jr. 1965–1966
Charles M. Nes Jr. 1966–1967
Robert L. Durham 1967–1968
George E. Kassabaum 1968–1969		
Rex Whitaker Allen 1969–1970	
Robert F. Hastings 1971 
Max O. Urbahn 1972
S. Scott Ferebee Jr. 1973
Archibald C. Rogers 1974
William Marshall Jr.	 1975
Louis de Moll 1976	
John McGinty 1977
Elmer E. Botsai 1978	
Ehrman B. Mitchell 1979
Charles E. Schwing 1980
Robert Randall Vosbeck 1981
Robert Lawrence 1982	
Robert Broshar 1983
George M. Notter 1984
R. Bruce Patty	1985
John A. Busby Jr. 1986	
Donald J. Hackl 1987	
Ted P. Pappas 1988
Benjamin E. Brewer Jr. 1989
Sylvester Damianos 1990

Jim Lawler 1991
W. Cecil Steward 1992
Susan A. Maxman 1993
L. William Chapin II	1994
Chester A. Widom 1995
Raymond Post Jr. 1996
Raj Barr-Kumar 1997
Ronald Arthur Altoon 1998	
Michael J. Stanton 1999
Ronald L. Skaggs 2000
John D. Anderson	2001
Gordon H. Chong	2002
Thompson E. Penney 2003
Eugene C. Hopkins 2004
Douglas L. Steidl 2005
Katherine Lee Schwennsen	2006
R. K. Stewart 2007
Marshall Emmiett Purnell	2008
Marvin J. Malecha 2009
George H. Miller	2010
Clark Manus 2011
Jeff Potter 2012	
Mickey Jacob 2013
Helene Combs Dreiling 2014
Elizabeth Chu Richter 2015
Russell A. Davidson 2016
Thomas Vonier 2017
Carl Elefante 2018
William J. Bates 2019 
L. Jane Frederick 2020
Peter J. Exley 2021
Daniel S. Hart 2022 
Emily Grandstaff-Rice 2023 (Current)
Kimberly Dowdell 2024 (President-elect)

See also
American Architectural Foundation (AAF)
AIA Columbus, a chapter of the American Institute of Architects
Architecture Billings Index
Boston Society of Architects (BSA), a chapter of the American Institute of Architects
Society of American Registered Architects

Footnotes

External links
 American Institute of Architects official website
 
 American Institute of Architects Records at Syracuse University (60 years of primary source material)
 Florida Institute of Architects Publications Digital Collection', including the American Institute of Architects' Florida Association's Florida Architect, Florida/Caribbean Architect, and others
 AIA Committee on the Environment (COTE) (archived 24 March 2011)
 AIA/COTE Top Ten Green Awards (archived 1 May 2004)
 e-Oculus, the AIA New York Chapter's e-zine (archived 29 July 2012)
 ARCHITECT Magazine, the magazine of the AIA, published by Hanley Wood.

 
1857 establishments in New York (state)
Architecture organizations based in the United States
Architecture-related professional associations
Organizations established in 1857
Professional associations based in the United States